A transport coefficient  measures how rapidly a perturbed system returns to equilibrium.

The transport coefficients occur in transport phenomenon with transport laws 
 

where:
  is a flux of the property 
 the transport coefficient  of this property 
 , the gradient force which acts on the property .

Transport coefficients can be expressed via a Green–Kubo relation:

where  is an observable occurring in a perturbed Hamiltonian,  is an ensemble average and the dot above the A denotes the time derivative.
For times  that are greater than the correlation time of the fluctuations of the observable the transport coefficient obeys a generalized Einstein relation:

In general a transport coefficient is a tensor.

Examples 
 Diffusion constant, relates the flux of particles with the negative gradient of the concentration (see Fick's laws of diffusion)
 Thermal conductivity (see Fourier's law)
 Ionic conductivity
 Mass transport coefficient
 Shear viscosity , where  is the viscous stress tensor (see Newtonian fluid)
 Electrical conductivity

See also 
Linear response theory
Onsager reciprocal relations

References 

Thermodynamics
Statistical mechanics